Events in the year 1643 in Norway.

Incumbents
Monarch: Christian IV

Events
 12 December - The Hannibal War starts.

Full date unknown
The first professional book publisher to use printing press in Norway is established in Oslo.

Arts and literature
The first printed book in Norway; "" is printed and published for the first time.

Births

Deaths

See also

References